is a throw in judo.  It is one of the original 40 throws of Judo as developed by Jigoro Kano.  It belongs to the third group, Sankyo, of the traditional throwing list, Gokyo (no waza), of Kodokan Judo. It is also part of the current 67 Throws of Kodokan Judo. It is classified as a hip technique, Koshi-Waza.  Hane goshi is also one of the 20 techniques in Danzan Ryu's Nagete list.

See also
The Canon Of Judo

Similar techniques, variants, and aliases 
Aliases:

Similar techniques
Ushiro Guruma, described in The Canon Of Judo by Kyuzo Mifune as a hip throw where tori uses one of his leg much as in Hane Goshi.  In the video, The Essence of Judo, Mifune demonstrates Ushiro Guruma, but notice that his foot does not quite catch uke's hip as described in The Canon Of Judo, but catches uke's inner thigh instead.

References

External links
 Judoinfo.com animation
 Danzan Ryu

Judo technique
Throw (grappling)
Grappling hold
Grappling positions
Martial art techniques